The Durbin and Greenbrier Valley Railroad  is a heritage and freight railroad in the U.S. states of Virginia and West Virginia. It operates the West Virginia State Rail Authority-owned Durbin Railroad and West Virginia Central Railroad , as well as the Shenandoah Valley Railroad in Virginia.  

Beginning in 2015, DGVR began operating the historic geared steam-powered Cass Scenic Railroad, which was previously operated by the West Virginia Division of Natural Resources as part of Cass Scenic Railroad State Park.

Trains
The DGVR operates five different excursion trains in West Virginia:

 The New Tygart Flyer, which operates out of Elkins.
 The Durbin Rocket, powered by a Climax or Heisler geared logging locomotive, operates from Durbin.
 The Cheat Mountain Salamander which operates out of Elkins.
 The Mountain Explorer Dinner Train which also leaves from Elkins.
 The Cass Scenic Railroad which operates from Cass. Three CSR trains are offered - one to Whittaker Station (daily); one to Bald Knob (daily) and one to Spruce (special schedule).

References

External links 

Durbin and Greenbrier Valley Railroad
HawkinsRails Durbin & Greenbrier Valley page

Heritage railroads in West Virginia
Spin-offs of CSX Transportation
Virginia railroads
Tourist attractions in Randolph County, West Virginia
Tourist attractions in Pocahontas County, West Virginia
Transportation in Randolph County, West Virginia
Transportation in Pocahontas County, West Virginia